Frederick J. Linari (21 July  1920 - 2 November 2012)  is a former American basketball player.

Basketball career
A forward from San Francisco Polytechnic High School, Linari played collegiately for Stanford University. He was a reserve on Stanford's 1942 national championship team. In the championship game, Linari was pressed into action in the game after starting forward Don Burness was unable to continue due to an ankle injury incurred earlier in the tournament. At just , Linari nonetheless filled in ably for the  Burness, playing 31 of 40 game minutes and scoring six points to help the Indians win the championship.

After college
After graduating from Stanford, Linari became a pilot for Pan Am and moved to Honolulu.

References

1920 births
2012 deaths
Basketball players from California
Forwards (basketball)
Sportspeople from Honolulu
Stanford Cardinal men's basketball players
American men's basketball players